A boot flag is a 1-byte value in a non-extended partition record, within a master boot record. It appears at the beginning of a partition record, as the value 0x80. A value of 0x00 indicates the partition does not have the boot flag set. Any other value is invalid.

Its primary function is to indicate to a MS-DOS/MS Windows-type boot loader which partition to boot. In some cases it is used by Windows XP/2000 to assign the active partition the letter "C:". The active partition is the partition where the boot flag is set. DOS and Windows allow only one boot partition to be set with the boot flag.

Other boot loaders used by third-party boot managers (such as GRUB or XOSL) can be installed to a master boot record and can boot primary or extended partitions, which do not have the boot flag set.

There are many disk editors that can modify the boot flag, such as Disk Management in Windows, GPartEd in Linux, and fdisk.

Some BIOSes test if the boot flag of at least one partition is set, otherwise they ignore the device in boot-order. Therefore, even if the bootloader does not need the flag, it has to be set to start the boot code from BIOS.

See also
 Master boot record
 Disk partitioning
 BIOS
 Boot loader

References

Booting